James Howard Horne (July 24, 1874 – April 13, 1959) was an athletic director and coach of American football, basketball, baseball, and track and field at Indiana University between 1898 and 1905.

Early life and education
Horne was born July 24, 1874 in Berlin, New Hampshire to John Roberts Horne and Sarah (Wheeler) Horne. Like his two older brothers, Irving Williams Horne and Rev. John Roberts Horne Jr., James H. Horne attended Bowdoin College where he was a member of Delta Upsilon and involved in a number of extracurricular activities including football and track and field. Horne was a four-year member of the varsity athletic (track and field) team, serving as the team's captain his junior and senior years. In the first two years of what has become the annual "State Meet" between Bates College, Colby College, and Bowdoin, Horne won the 100-yard dash (1895, 1896), 120 yard high hurdles (1895, 1896), 220 yard dash (1895), 220 intermediate hurdles (1896), and long jump (1896). In 1896, his time of 16.2 seconds in the 110 hurdles was the fourth best time in the nation. Horne graduated from Bowdoin in 1897 with an A.B.

Athletic director
While at Bowdoin, Horne held the position of Assistant to the Director of the Gymnasium from 1895 to 1897. From 1897 to 1898, he was "in charge of [the] Gymnasium" at the Hebron Academy in Hebron, Maine prior to succeeding Madison G. Gonterman as Indiana University's third Director of the Men's Gymnasium in 1898. However, Horne saw himself as more of a "Director of Athletics" for the school in that he "handled all the business of that line, making all schedules, looking up and hiring coaches, as well as all the business affairs connected with athletics." During Horne's tenure as athletic director, Indiana was admitted membership to the Big Ten Conference in December, 1899. He served as IU's director until 1905 and was succeeded by Zora G. Clevenger.

Coach
Horne also replaced Gonterman as the head coach of the Indiana Hoosiers football team from 1898 to 1904, compiling a record of 33–21–5. In his first game at the helm, he led the Hoosiers to a 16–0 victory over Rose Polytechnic. Horne's second season at IU was his best with a 6–2 record, including five shutouts and the school's first triumph over in-state rival Purdue on Thanksgiving Day 1899. During the 1900 college football season, he became the first football coach at Indiana to compete in the Big Ten Conference, then known as the Western Conference. Horne was eventually replaced by James M. Sheldon for the 1905 season.

Horne became Indiana University's first baseball coach in 1899 and tallied a mark of 10–8 over two seasons. In April 1899, he split his first two games with Borden Institute, losing the first 4–3 and winning the following day 12–1. Robert Wicker took over Horne's duties as head coach in 1901.

The first men's basketball team at Indiana University was also coached by Horne. On February 8, 1901, the Hoosiers traveled by train to Indianapolis where they lost their first game to Butler, 20–17. After losing their next two against Butler and Purdue, Horne coached the team to its first ever victory with a 26–17 win over Wabash in Bloomington one month later. Horne is officially credited with coaching Indiana to a 1–4 record in his only season at the helm, however, he was closely involved with the team for three more seasons.

In addition to football, baseball, and basketball, Horne coached track at IU where he introduced LeRoy Samse to the pole vault. Samse earned a silver medal in the pole vault at the 1904 Summer Olympics. In 1903, Horne accidentally killed the captain of the track team, Bruce Lockridge, the uncle of novelist Ross Lockridge Jr., with an errant throw of a twelve-pound hammer in Louisville. One report indicated that he was so distraught that he attempted suicide.

Later life
A 1912 directory of Bowdoin alumni reported that Horne was in "business" in Conway, New Hampshire after 1906, and a 1917 directory of Delta Upsilon members placed him in "business" in Wolfboro Falls, New Hampshire. His World War I draft registration card notes that he had "total loss of hearing." Horne wrote about his experiences at Indiana University in a letter dated May 14, 1948. He would die in 1959 in Salem, New Hampshire at the age of 84.

Head coaching record

Football

Basketball

Baseball

Notes

References

1874 births
1959 deaths
Indiana Hoosiers athletic directors
Indiana Hoosiers baseball coaches
Indiana Hoosiers football coaches
Indiana Hoosiers men's basketball coaches
College men's track and field athletes in the United States
Basketball coaches from New Hampshire
Bowdoin College alumni
People from Berlin, New Hampshire
Baseball coaches from New Hampshire